Convict Pool is an EP released by Arizona band Calexico. Among its tracks is a cover version of the Minutemen's classic, "Corona," with an arrangement featuring mariachi horns reminiscent of Johnny Cash's "Ring of Fire," and a cover of Love's "Alone Again Or" featuring flamenco handclaps.

Track listing
 "Alone Again Or" – (3:24) (with Nicolai Dunger and His Band; music by Bryan MacLean)
 "Convict Pool" – (3:58) (Joey Burns)
 "Si Tu Disais" – (3:23) (lyrics by Dominique Ané; music by Ané, Chataigner, Toorop, Bondu; originally sung by Françoiz Breut)
 "Corona" – (3:21) (Dennes D. Boon)
 "Praskovia" – (2:44) (Burns)
 "Sirena" – (3:42) (Burns)

References

Calexico (band) EPs
2004 EPs